Alfred Freund-Zinnbauer MBE (26 June 1910 – 9 November 1978) was an Australian community worker, internee, Lutheran pastor and refugee. Zinnbauer was born in Vienna, Austro-Hungarian Empire (Austria) and died in Adelaide, South Australia.

His wife was Helga Josephine Zinnbauer, a librarian.

See also

References

Refugees in Australia
Austrian Lutherans
Australian Lutherans
1910 births
1978 deaths
Members of the Order of the British Empire
Austrian emigrants to Australia
20th-century Lutherans